Jorma Rinne (20 April 1936 – 25 May 2003) was a Finnish discus thrower who competed in the 1972 Summer Olympics.

References

1936 births
2003 deaths
Finnish male discus throwers
Olympic athletes of Finland
Athletes (track and field) at the 1972 Summer Olympics